Stereo, or stereophonic sound, is the reproduction of sound using two or more independent audio channels.

Stereo may also refer to:

Film and television
 Stereo (1969 film), a film by David Cronenberg
 Stereo (2014 film), a German film
 3D film, using stereo imaging

Music 
 Music centre
 Car stereo
 Boombox
 Shelf stereo

Bands
 The Stereo, an American pop rock band
 Stereos (band), a Canadian pop rock band
 The Stereos, an American doo wop group

Albums
 Stereo (Christie Front Drive album), 1997
 Stereo (Paul Westerberg album), 2002
 Stereo (Vallejo album), 2002
 Stereos (album), by Stereos, 2009
 Stereo, by Gemeliers, 2018

Songs
 "Stereo", by Sparks from Terminal Jive, 1980
 "Stereo" (Pavement song), 1997
 "Stereo" (The Watchmen song), 1998
 "Stereo" (John Legend song), 2007
 "Stereo", by Unklejam, 2007
 "Stereo" (Anna Abreu song), 2011
 "Stereo" (MGK song), 2012

Other uses 
 STEREO, a pair of NASA solar observatory spacecraft
 STEREO experiment, a physics experiment

See also 
 High fidelity
 Stereopsis
 Stereoscopy